Ari Berman (born February 18th, 1970) is an American-Israeli rabbi and academic administrator who serves as the fifth President of Yeshiva University.

Early life and education
Berman was raised in Queens, New York and graduated from the Marsha Stern Talmudical Academy in 1987. He studied in Yeshivat Har Etzion in Alon Shevut before earning a Bachelor of Arts degree from Yeshiva College, graduating magna cum laude in 1991, rabbinical ordination from the Rabbi Isaac Elchanan Theological Seminary, and an M.A. in Medieval Jewish Philosophy from Bernard Revel Graduate School.

Career
Berman served successively as rabbinic intern, assistant rabbi, and associate rabbi at The Jewish Center of Manhattan beginning in 1994, and was promoted to be their lead rabbi in 2000. He also taught Talmud in the Stone Beit Midrash Program of Yeshiva University starting in 1998.

In 2008, he left the Jewish Center and moved to Israel, where he completed a Ph.D. in Jewish thought from Hebrew University under the guidance of Dr. Moshe Halbertal, on the topic of Ger Toshav – gentiles who accept the Noahide Laws – in Jewish Law of the Middle Ages. He also served as Rosh HaMerkaz, or head, of the Heichal Shlomo Jewish Heritage Center in Jerusalem and was an instructor at Herzog College. While in Israel, he resided in Neve Daniel.

On November 16, 2016, Berman was named President of Yeshiva University. He began his tenure on June 5, 2017, succeeding Richard Joel. The formal investiture ceremony took place the following September 10.

Personal life 
Berman's uncle is Julius Berman, a rabbi and lawyer who serves on the Board of Trustees of Yeshiva University and as Chairman Emeritus of the Board of Trustees of Rabbi Isaac Elchanan Theological Seminary. Berman is married to Anita Berman and has five children.

References

Yeshiva University faculty
1970 births
Living people
Orthodox rabbis
American rabbis
Presidents of Yeshiva University
Rabbi Isaac Elchanan Theological Seminary semikhah recipients
21st-century American Jews
Modern Orthodox rabbis
Israeli settlers
Yeshivat Har Etzion
Yeshiva University